Even Better Than the Real Thing Vol. 1 is an Irish charity album featuring a variety of artists performing acoustic cover versions of popular songs. It was released in 2003 by RMG Chart Entertainment Ltd. The songs on the album were recorded live and acoustic on The Ray D'Arcy Show on Today FM.

The album was made in aid of the National Children's Hospital in Tallaght. The album's name is a reference to U2's song, "Even Better Than the Real Thing".

Track listing

*Also features a hidden track of Picturehouse covering "Papa Don't Preach" by Madonna.

References

2003 compilation albums
Compilation albums by Irish artists
Charity albums
The Ray D'Arcy Show